Georg Pachmann (1600–1652) was an Austrian painter.

Pachmann was born in Frymburk. He specialized in painting portraits, including many royal subjects. Pachmann died in Vienna in 1652.

References

 

1600 births
1652 deaths
17th-century Austrian painters
Austrian male painters